Karamat-e-Ishq is a Pakistani romance drama directed by Naeem Khan, written by Doctor Ali Arslan and produced by Eveready Pictures. It originally aired on TVOne.

Plot 
A thrilling story of passionate love, fierce enmity and brutal revenge. Feudal landlord Shahmir and Nabila’s son Karamat Shah is a respected Pir in his village while his half brother Mohsin is always sidelined, creating conflicts between the brothers. But their enmity becomes vicious when Karamat falls for Mohsin’s beloved Alishba.
Someone in this love triangle is destined to die. Who will it be?

Landlord Shahmir and Nabila are deeply in love and get married. Soon after Nabila is involved in a car accident and becomes paralysed. Her eye movements somehow lead the villagers to believe she has supernatural powers and she is a Pirni. So when she dies after delivering a male child, her son Karamat Shah is also considered a Pir.
Shahmir is now persuaded to marry his cousin Nasreen who later 
on gives birth to a son Mohsin. But while the elder son Pir Karamat Shah is respected and loved, Mohsin is always sidelined. This leads to great friction between the brothers but when Karamat falls for Mohsin’s sweetheart Alishba, their enmity becomes more fierce. 
This leads to a series of raging family battles resulting in murder, madness and vicious revenge.

Cast 
 Babar Ali
 Sara Khan
 Sidra Batool
 Hina Altaf
 Hiba Ali
 Faizan Khawaja
 Taqi Ahmed
 Salim Mairaj
 Munawar Saeed
 Firdous Jamal
 Rubina Ashraf
 Ismat Iqbal
 Fauzia Mushtaq
 Humera Zahid
 Shahzad Ali Khan
 Haneef Bachan
 Ali Anjum
 Fareeha Jabeen

References

Pakistani drama television series
2018 Pakistani television series debuts
2018 Pakistani television series endings
Urdu-language television shows
TVOne Pakistan